Mirbelia granitica is a species of flowering plant in the family Fabaceae and is endemic to inland areas  of Western Australia. It is an erect or spreading shrub with spiny branches, scattered linear to narrowly egg-shaped leaves and yellow and red flowers.

Description

Taxonomy
Mirbelia granitica was first formally described in 1987 by Michael Crisp and Joan M. Taylor in the Journal of the Adelaide Botanic Gardens from specimens collected by Margaret Corrick near the Lake King-Norseman road in 1985. The specific epithet (granitica) means "living on granite soil".

Distribution and habitat
This mirbelia grows heath or low shrubland on granite hills and outcrops in the Avon Wheatbelt, Coolgardie, Mallee and Murchison bioregions of inland Western Australia.

Conservation status
Mirbelia granitica is listed as "not threatened" by the Government of Western Australia Department of Biodiversity, Conservation and Attractions.

References 

Flora of Western Australia
Plants described in 1987
granitica
Taxa named by Michael Crisp